Gqom  (Igqomu) is a genre of electronic dance music that emerged in the early 2010s from Durban, South Africa, pioneered largely by producer DJ Nathan_Medee, DJ Lag, Rudeboyz, Griffit Vigo, Mbreshcar SA and Citizen Boy. It was developed from kwaito, a subgenre of house music from South Africa. Unlike other South African electronic music, gqom is typified by minimal, raw and repetitive sound with heavy bass beats but without the four-on-the-floor rhythm pattern.
Music connoisseurs who were pivotal in influencing the genre's international acclaim included the likes of South African rapper Okmalumkoolkat, Italian record label Gqom Oh owner, Malumz Kole inclusive of music taste-maker and public relations liaison, Cherish Lala Mankai, Afrotainment record label owner DJ Tira, Babes Wodumo, Liam Reddy and Busiswa.

Name and characteristics
The word gqom derives from an onomatopoeic combination of click consonants in the isiZulu meaning a hitting drum. It is also expressed as qgom, igqom, gqomu or variants thereof.

Gqom is known for its beats which have a minimal, raw and repetitive sound with heavy bass. It is mainly described as having a dark and hypnotic club sound. The style of beats does not use the four-on-the-floor rhythm pattern which is often heard in other house music. Typical lyrical themes include nightlife. It often uses one phrase or a few lines which are repeated numerous times in the song. Gqom was developed by a young generation of technologically skilled DJs producing in D.I.Y. fashion with software such as FL Studio and often self distributing their music on file sharing platforms. From the mid-2010s the genre gained prominence abroad, especially in London. Gqom also played it part on making taxi's money as people discovered a day to celebrate Gqom called Gqom Explosion that is mostly known as iNazoke. It is celebrated by people from the city of Durban, but eventually other cities and towns in KwaZulu-Natal started celebrating it.

Dance moves
Gqom music is associated with a number of distinctive dance moves, including gwara gwara, vosho and bhenga.

Gwara gwara 
Gwara gwara is performed by rolling and swinging the arm and the elbow in terms of making a circle, and one of the leg moves in connection with the arm's rhythm. It has some similarities to the Stanky Leg. Gwara gwara was made famous by South African musician Babes Wodumo. The dance move created by disc jockey and producer DJ Bongz, was heavily imitated by South Africans and other African people mainly during 2016. It also received widespread globally as the choreography was adopted by notable musicians: Rihanna performed the dance move while performing Wild Thoughts at the 60th Annual Grammy Awards in 2018. Childish Gambino performed the dance in the video of his song "This Is America". BTS performs the dance in the choreography for their song Idol, released in 2018.

References

External links
 Future Sound of Mzansi (Part 1), 2014 film documentary by Spoek Mathambo and Lebogang Rasethaba featuring gqom.
 The Gqom Generation of Durban, South Africa (Afopop Worldwide podcast episode, 19 July 2018)
 Gqom music: Spreading from Durban to the world (5 minutes) (First aired 22 November 2018 on BBC World Service - Global Beats)  **See Gqom for the full podcast (53 minutes)

African electronic dance music
House music genres
Minimal music
South African styles of music
Kwaito
Electronic dance music